The Rally Kazakhstan is a rally-raid which is held in the country of Kazakhstan since 2017. Motorcycles first took part in 2021; with the original debut cancelled in 2020 due to the COVID-19 pandemic. The event was part of the FIA World Cup for Cross-Country Rallies since 2017; now part of the combined World Rally-Raid Championship.

The rally is organized and promoted by the Automotosport Federation of the Republic of Kazakhstan.

The 2020 and 2022 editions were cancelled due to the COVID-19 pandemic and Russian invasion of Ukraine, respectively.

Winners

Cars

Motorcycles

Quads

References

External links
 

Rally raid races
Recurring sporting events established in 2017
Cross Country Rally World Cup races